Kimbal Reeve Musk (born 20 September 1972) is a South African restaurateur, chef, and entrepreneur.  He owns The Kitchen Restaurant Group, a collection of "community" restaurants located in Colorado, Chicago, and Indianapolis. He is the co-founder and chairman of Big Green, a 501(c)(3) nonprofit that has built hundreds of outdoor classrooms called "Learning Gardens" in schoolyards across America. Musk is also the co-founder and chairman of Square Roots, an urban farming company in Brooklyn, New York City, growing food in hydroponic, indoor, climate controlled shipping containers. Musk currently sits on the boards of Tesla Inc. and SpaceX, both of which his brother Elon is the current CEO. He was on the board of Chipotle Mexican Grill from 2013 to 2019. He is the brother of Elon Musk and Tosca Musk, son of Errol and Maye Musk, and a major shareholder in Tesla.

In 1995 he co-founded, with his brother, Elon Musk, the software company Zip2, which was acquired by Compaq for $307 million in 1999.

Early life
Musk grew up with his brother Elon, sister Tosca, and many cousins. His mother, Maye Musk, is a dietician and model and his father Errol Musk  had his own engineering practice. After finishing high school in Pretoria, South Africa, Musk left to meet his brother in Kingston, Ontario, Canada, and enrolled at Queen's University to pursue a degree in business. While in school, Musk first worked at Scotiabank. He graduated with his degree from Queen's University in 1995.

Business career
Musk's first entrepreneurship venture was a residential painting business with College Pro Painters in 1994, the same year he and his elder brother, Elon started their second company, Zip2. Zip2 was an online city guide that provided content for the new online versions of The New York Times and the Chicago Tribune newspapers. The company was sold in 1999 to Compaq for $307 million.

After selling Zip2, Musk invested in several young software and technology companies. Musk was an early investor in his brother's venture X.com, an online financial services and email payments company. X.com merged with PayPal, which in October 2002 was acquired by eBay for $1.5 billion in stock.

While Elon stayed in California, Kimbal moved to New York and enrolled into the French Culinary Institute in New York City. In April 2004, Musk opened The Kitchen, a community bistro in Boulder, Colorado with Jen Lewin and Hugo Matheson. The Kitchen has been named one of "America's Top Restaurants" according to Food & Wine, Zagat’s, Gourmet, OpenTable, and the James Beard Foundation. In addition to its flagship restaurant in Boulder, The Kitchen has locations in downtown Denver and Chicago.

From 2006 to 2011, Musk served as the CEO of OneRiot, an advertising network. In September 2011, Walmart-Labs acquired OneRiot for an undisclosed purchase price.

In 2011, Next Door American Eatery opened in downtown Boulder as a fast casual American eatery. Next Door American Eatery is a growing restaurant concept with ten locations as of 2019.

After seven years of supporting the Growe Foundation to plant school gardens in the Boulder community, in 2011 Musk and Matheson established Big Green (originally named The Kitchen Community), a 501c3 nonprofit to help connect kids to real food by creating dynamic Learning Garden classrooms in schools across America. Learning Gardens teach children an understanding of food, healthy eating, lifestyle choices and environment through lesson plans and activities that tie into existing school curriculum, such as math, science, and literacy.

Each of The Kitchen restaurants donates a percentage of sales to help plant Learning Gardens in its local community. In 2012, Big Green built 26 gardens in Colorado, 16 in Chicago, and 12 more around the USA.

In December 2012, Chicago Mayor Rahm Emanuel handed Musk's nonprofit $1 million to install 80 Learning Gardens in Chicago city schools. On 2 February 2015, The Kitchen Community celebrated its 200th Learning Garden build at Camino Nuevo Charter Academy, a high school in Los Angeles Unified School District which also marked the District's first SEEDS Project.

By the end of 2015, four years after its founding, The Kitchen Community had built 260 Learning Gardens across Chicago, Denver, Los Angeles and Memphis. In 2016, Musk co-founded Square Roots, an urban farming company that grows organic food in shipping containers. The company formed a partnership with Gordon Food Services (GFS) to expand outside of NYC. In January 2018, The Kitchen Community (TKC), expanded into a national nonprofit called Big Green and announced its seventh city, Detroit, to build outdoor Learning Garden classrooms in 100 schools across the Motor City. As of 2019, Big Green is in seven American cities with nearly 600 schools across its network impacting over 300,000 students every day. Musk and Big Green have established Plant a Seed Day, an international holiday.

Musk has been profiled in major publications such as The New York Times, CNN, The Wall Street Journal, Fast Company, WIRED, Chicago Sun Times, CBS News, Business Insider, Entrepreneur Magazine, Musk was named a Global Social Entrepreneur of the Year 2018 by the World Economic Forum.

Musk faced scrutiny in 2020 after changing his Next Door's Family Fund program in the middle of the coronavirus pandemic. The fund was originally set up to help employees during an emergency situation. Contributions came from employees of Next Door.

On 9 February 2021, Musk sold 30,000 shares of Tesla, Inc. worth $25,604,000. On 24 February 2022, it was reported that the SEC was investigating Musk for possible insider trading violations after he sold 88,500 shares of Tesla valued at $108,000,000 one day before his brother put out a poll on Twitter asking if he should sell 10% of his Tesla shares. As a result of that poll, Elon Musk sold billions of dollars of Tesla shares and the stock price sank.

Personal life
Musk married Jen Lewin, with whom he established The Kitchen. The couple had three children together. They later divorced. He lives in Boulder, Colorado. In April 2018, he married Christiana Wyly, an environmental activist and the daughter of billionaire Sam Wyly.

Controversy
Musk's restaurant group collected funds (called the Family Fund) from employees to cover hardships and personal emergencies, but during the COVID-19 pandemic of 2020, the restaurants closed "permanently" and the employees were locked out of the funds they had contributed to. Later, the restaurants reopened but reportedly did not restore the fund to those who contributed. Musk later disputed reports of the controversy, citing lack of facts by journalists. The Kitchen Restaurant Group reports the fund now receives contributions from owners and customers; as tips for take-out orders are rerouted to the fund and then matched by the owners. The group also reports that grants have been awarded and both furloughed and laid-off workers will be considered in future.

References

1972 births
Living people
21st-century American businesspeople
21st-century Canadian businesspeople
21st-century South African businesspeople
American arts and crafts industry businesspeople
American environmentalists
American male chefs
American people of British descent
American people of Canadian descent
American people of Pennsylvania Dutch descent
American philanthropists
American restaurateurs
American venture capitalists
Businesspeople from New York City
Businesspeople in information technology
Canadian environmentalists
Canadian male chefs
Canadian people of British descent
Canadian people of South African descent
Canadian philanthropists
Canadian restaurateurs
Canadian venture capitalists
Chefs from New York City
International Culinary Center alumni
Musk family
Naturalized citizens of Canada
New York University faculty
People from Pretoria
Queen's University at Kingston alumni
Scotiabank people
SpaceX people
South African emigrants to the United States
South African environmentalists
South African people of British descent
South African people of Canadian descent
South African philanthropists
Tesla, Inc. people
University of Colorado Denver people
White South African people